Hachi Darreh (also Romanized as Ḩāchī Darreh; also known as Āchī Darreh and Ājī Darreh) is a village in Kani Bazar Rural District, Khalifan District, Mahabad County, West Azerbaijan Province, Iran. At the 2006 census, its population was 227, in 35 families.

References 

Populated places in Mahabad County